Mazus radicans, commonly known as swamp musk, is a wetland herb in the family Phrymaceae, native to New Zealand.

Description
M. radicans is a small, creeping wetland herb which is native to New Zealand. It has prostrate main branches rooting at nodes. The lateral branches are short and leafy with  distinctive internodes on leaf-bearing or subterranean and horizontal branches. Leaves are a brownish colour. The base of leaves is gradually small and blade margin is slightly undulate to serrate and broad-acute to rounded at apex. Margins have soft hairs. Pedicels usually lack bracts and fall off early. Externally, it is white with purple flesh; the internal flesh is deep purple. It has a white and yellow lip. The lower lip has rounded lobes, that are glabrous apart from the palate. The length of the tube is twice that of the calyx. The fruit is pink and red in colour and broadly ellipsoid.

Distribution

New Zealand range 
It is a common wetland weed on the South Island. It can be seen in damp places such as wild wetland and swamp. As an endemic species in North Island, it appears in Awanui near Kaitaia, Hautai Beach and Waipapa Stream near East Cape. It survives in higher regions in New Zealand up to 100-1100 m above sea level.

Habitat preferences 
It is found in lowland swamp forest in sparsely-vegetated coastal wetlands and in moist sub-alpline areas. It prefers places with short and thick sedges and grasses, often in sites with seasonal water cover or in areas of heavy grazing.

Life cycle

M. radicans is a perennial or annual herb. It usually has a flower from November to March in New Zealand. The flowering time is in summer. In autumn, fruits mature, but do not fall off the plant. Fresh seeds are easy to germinate and the best environment for its reproduction is permanently moist or badly drained earth under the shade, which is a good ground shelter. The flowers are pollinated by bees.

References

Endemic flora of New Zealand
radicans
Taxa named by Thomas Frederic Cheeseman